Novokhrenovoye is a rural locality (a selo) in Oktyabrskoye Rural Settlement, Paninsky District, Voronezh Oblast, Russia. The population was 489 as of 2010. There are 9 streets.

Geography 
Novokhrenovoye is located on the right bank of the Tamlyk River, 18 km southwest of Panino (the district's administrative centre) by road. Novokhrenovoye is the nearest rural locality.

References 

Rural localities in Paninsky District